The Childhood of Icarus (original French title: L'Enfance d'Icare) is a 2011 film co-written, co-produced, and directed by the Romanian-born Swiss director Alex Iordachescu.

The film stars an ensemble cast that includes notable actors from France, Switzerland, and Romania: Guillaume Depardieu, Alysson Paradis, Carlo Brandt, Sophie Lukasik, Dorotheea Petre, Patricia Bopp, Jean-Pierre Gos, and Madalina Constantin. It was released more than two years after the death of the leading actor, Depardieu, from an infection acquired while making this movie.

Plot
Following an accident, Jonathan Vogel (played by Guillaume Depardieu) loses a leg. Professor Karr (played by Carlo Brandt) offers a revolutionary treatment that will change his life. But this crazy dream turns into a nightmare, and Vogel becomes the victim of a terrible medical mistake.

References

External links 
 

2011 films
Swiss science fiction films
French science fiction films
Romanian science fiction films
2011 science fiction films
2010s French films
2000s French films